The 14th Africa Movie Academy Awards was held 20 October 2018 in Kigali, Rwanda. The event was hosted by Nse Ikpe Etim and Arthur Nkusi.

Awards

Winners are listed highlighted in boldface.

References

Africa Movie Academy Awards ceremonies
2018 film awards
2018 in Nigerian cinema